Pazza famiglia is an Italian television series.

Cast

Enrico Montesano: Leonardo Capasso
Alessandra Casella: Gianna
Caterina Sylos Labini: Laura
Kay Rush: Giulia
Barbara Snellenburg: Lara
Paolo Panelli: Paolo
Carlo Cartier: Giorgio
Riccardo Salerno: Michele
Fabrizio Cerusico: Michele (second season)
Vincenzo Crocitti: Osvaldo
Alessandra Bellini: Valeria
Luis Molteni: Loffredo
Massimo Giuliani: Marcello 
Carlo Monni: Lawyer Piccioni
Idris Sanneh: Mario
Serena Grandi: Lisa 
Carlo Croccolo: Lawyer De Cuirtiis
Patrizia Pellegrino: Luisa 
Enzo Cannavale: Rag. Peggio
Gianni Musy: Victor

See also
List of Italian television series

External links
 

Italian television series
1995 Italian television series debuts
1996 Italian television series endings
RAI original programming